Dimitra Patapi (born ) is a Greek female  track cyclist. She competed in the team sprint event at the 2011 UCI Track Cycling World Championships.

Major results
2013
Athens Track Grand Prix
1st Keirin
1st Sprint

References

External links
 Profile at cyclingarchives.com

1992 births
Living people
Greek track cyclists
Greek female cyclists
Place of birth missing (living people)
21st-century Greek women